The Catholic Church in the Czech Republic is part of the worldwide Catholic Church, under the spiritual leadership of the Pope, curia in Rome, and the Conference of Czech Bishops.

Overview
In the 2021 census, 741,000 people identified themselves Roman Catholics, another 8,309 people identified as Greek Catholics, and an additional 236,000 people described themselves as simply Catholics. Together, they represent over 9% of the Czech population. There are eight dioceses including two archdioceses. Additionally, there is a separate jurisdiction for those of the Byzantine Rite called the Ruthenian Catholic Apostolic Exarchate of Czech Republic. The Catholic Church is the largest single religious denomination in the country.

History

Protestant Bohemia vs. the Habsburgs
After the death of Jan Hus in 1415, the Czechs were mostly Hussite, a diverse sect which was considered heretical by the Catholic Church. The Hussite wars were fought over religious freedom in Bohemia as five consecutive crusades ordered by the Pope failed miserably. The majority of Hussites (the Utraquists) eventually made peace with Rome in the Religious peace of Kutna Hora of 1485. However, the Unity of the Brethren, founded in 1457, maintained a radical course and eventually played an important role in the Protestant Reformation and widely disseminating its principles. By the end of the 16th century, less than 20% of the population remained Catholic. After their defeat in the 1620 Battle of the White Mountain, Bohemia and Moravia were subjugated and forcefully re-converted to Catholicism by the imperial authorities, with Protestantism all but vanquished. The Czechs were made once again majority Catholic until after World War I, when anti-Catholicism fed by nationalist anti-German sentiment and national revival perceiving the Church as historical enemy caused mass defections from the Church.

Following World War II
The reconstituted Protestant Hussite Church and the Czech Brethren were major beneficiaries of this defection from Catholicism until after World War II, when the overall belief in organized religion started to fall steeply. In addition, the Sudeten Germans, who were those Austrians who ended up within Czech borders after World War I, were mostly Catholics, and their expulsion after World War II also reduced the Church's presence. Over 90% Catholic in 1910, the Czech Republic is now reduced to some 10%.

Communist regime
The Communist regime, which seized power in 1948 in what was then Czechoslovakia, confiscated all the property owned by churches and persecuted many priests. Churches were then allowed to function only under the state's strict control and supervision and priests' salaries paid by the state. Churches were seized, priests jailed or executed and those allowed to celebrate liturgies did so under the supervision of the secret police. After the Velvet Revolution, some churches and monasteries were returned, but the churches have since sought to get back other assets such as farms, woodlands and buildings.

During the Communist regime, various underground Catholic movements existed.  Among these is the Koinotes group, centered on Bishop Felix Davidek, whose vicar general was Ludmila Javorová, ordained by him to the presbyterate.

2012 Agreement
In January 2012 the Czech government agreed to pay billions of dollars in compensation for property seized by the former totalitarian regime from the Church. The compensation plan was to be spread over 30 years

Under the plan, the country's 17 churches, including Catholic, Protestant and Orthodox, would get 56 percent of their former property now held by the state – estimated at 75 billion koruna ($3.7 billion) – and 59 billion koruna ($2.9 billion) in financial compensation paid to them over the next 30 years. Eighty percent of funds and property will go the Catholic Church, by far the biggest recipient. The state will also gradually stop covering their expenses over the next 17. In 2008, a similar bill was approved by the government but Parliament rejected it.

Structure

Archdiocese of Prague
Diocese of Plzeň
Diocese of Litoměřice
Diocese of České Budějovice
Diocese of Hradec Králové
Archdiocese of Olomouc
Diocese of Brno
Diocese of Ostrava-Opava
Apostolic Exarchate of the Greek Catholic Church in the Czech Republic

About 200 of the Czech Republic's 1,370 priests are from neighbouring Poland.

References

External links
 Tomáš  Petráček, Bohemian Secularity: How Czech Society and State went from "Catholic" to "World´s most Atheist".

 
Czech Republic
Czech Republic